Harry George Matuzak (January 27, 1910 – November 16, 1978) was a professional baseball player.  He was a right-handed pitcher over parts of two seasons (1934, 1936) with the Philadelphia Athletics.  For his career, he compiled an 0–4 record, with a 5.77 earned run average, and 35 strikeouts in 39 innings pitched.

He was born in Omer, Michigan and died in Fairhope, Alabama at the age of 68.

External links

1910 births
1978 deaths
Philadelphia Athletics players
Major League Baseball pitchers
Baseball players from Michigan
Oklahoma City Indians players
Tulsa Oilers (baseball) players
Albany Senators players
Baltimore Orioles (IL) players
Memphis Chickasaws players
Montreal Royals players
Birmingham Barons players
People from Arenac County, Michigan
McCook Generals players